The California Philharmonic Orchestra, often abbreviated as Cal Phil, is a musical orchestra based within the American state of California.

The Orchestra performed twenty years of outdoor summer concerts between 1996 and 2016, but then discontinued the practice.  Beginning in 2011 the Orchestra performed at the Santa Anita Racetrack under the musical directorship of Victor Vener, the organization's founder.

References

Orchestras based in California